Kelvinside Hillhead Parish Church, originally Hillhead Parish Church, is a parish church of the Church of Scotland, serving the Hillhead and Kelvinside areas of Glasgow, Scotland. It is within the Church of Scotland's Presbytery of Glasgow.

History
Hillhead expanded rapidly during the second half of the 19th century, especially following the relocation of the University of Glasgow to Gilmorehill in the 1870s. The Church of Scotland responded by constructing a temporary church in a field in front of what is now Athole Gardens in Hillhead. This corrugated iron church was opened in 1871.

The congregation soon outgrew the temporary building and a decision to construct a permanent church was taken. Finding a suitable site was problematic, partly due to old mineworkings, but the new church was opened on 8 October 1876. At first, the congregation operated under the supervision of the Kirk Session of Govan Old Parish Church, but in 1882 became a "quoad sacra" parish with its own Kirk Session (i.e. a parish for church purposes, but not a civil parish for local government purposes).

Other churches were also constructed nearby. These included Belmont Church, which united with Hillhead Parish Church in 1950. In 1978, Belmont and Hillhead Parish Church united with Kelvinside (Botanic Gardens) Church, becoming Kelvinside Hillhead Parish Church (and using the old Hillhead Parish Church buildings in Observatory Road).

After standing derelict for four years, the former Kelvinside Parish Church (Botanic Gardens), was converted into the "Òran Mór" restaurant, entertainment and music venue, which opened in 2004. The refurbishment features a ceiling designed by the Glaswegian writer and artist Alasdair Gray.

Building
The building was designed by the architect James Sellar and completed in 1876. It is modelled on the Sainte-Chapelle in Paris. The church is located in Observatory Road, Hillhead. It is a Category A listed building.

Ministry

The church is currently without a permanent minister and is being served by a ministry team of Rev Jim Ferguson, Rev Dr Roger Sturrock and Rev Dr Doug Gay (Principal of Trinity College and a lecturer in Practical Theology at the University of Glasgow).

See also
List of Church of Scotland parishes

Other churches nearby

Jordanhill Parish Church (Church of Scotland)
Kelvin Stevenson Memorial Church (Church of Scotland)
Knightswood St. Margaret's Parish Church (Church of Scotland)
St. John's Renfield Church (Church of Scotland)
St. Luke's Cathedral (Orthodox)
St. Mary's Cathedral (Episcopalian)
Wellington Church (Church of Scotland)

References

External links
Kelvinside Hillhead Parish Church - official website
Presbytery of Glasgow (of the Church of Scotland)

Church of Scotland churches in Glasgow
Category A listed buildings in Glasgow
Churches completed in 1876
19th-century Church of Scotland church buildings
Listed churches in Glasgow
Hillhead